The 2017 Pac-12 Conference women's basketball tournament presented by New York Life was the postseason women's basketball tournament at KeyArena in Seattle, Washington from March 2–5, 2017.
Stanford defeated Oregon State 48-43 to win the automatic bid into the Women's NCAA Tournament.

Seeds
Teams were seeded by conference record, with ties broken in the following order:
 Record between the tied teams
 Record against the highest-seeded team not involved in the tie, going down through the seedings as necessary
 Higher RPI

Schedule

Thursday-Sunday, March 2–5, 2017

The top four seeds received a first-round bye.

Bracket

All-Tournament Team
Source:

Most Outstanding Player

See also

 2017 Pac-12 Conference men's basketball tournament

References

Tournament
Pac-12 Conference women's basketball tournament
Basketball competitions in Seattle
2017 in Seattle
College basketball tournaments in Washington (state)
Women's sports in Washington (state)